Varntresk is a village in the municipality of Hattfjelldal in Nordland county, Norway. The village is located on the eastern shore of the large lake Røssvatnet. Varntresk Church is located in this village, and it serves the northern part of the municipality. There is also a small school in Varntresk.

References

Hattfjelldal
Villages in Nordland